Glen A. Wilson High School is a public high school located in Hacienda Heights, California.  It is one of two high schools located in the unincorporated community, and one of four in the Hacienda La Puente Unified School District.

Wilson was ranked 333 out of 804 in Newsweek's 2003 web-exclusive extended list of top U.S. public high schools. It ranked 861 in the 2007 list of the top 1,000 U.S. public schools.
Wilson was ranked 121 out of 500 in Newsweek's America's Best High Schools in 2011.

History
The school was started September 1966 on the campus of the neighboring Rowland High School in Rowland Heights, California, where students attended a split session year until the campus was ready for occupancy in September 1967.

The school was named for Glen A. Wilson, former Superintendent of the La Puente Union High School District 1953-1972 (which became Hacienda La Puente Unified School District in 1970). He was born in Alpaugh, California, on September 11, 1913.  He was a resident of Hillcrest in La Verne, California when he died on September 7, 1996.

He held bachelor's and master's degrees from Occidental College (1936, 1940), and a Doctorate in Education from University of Southern California (1965).

He began his career in education as a 6th grade teacher in El Centro in 1937, and retired from education as superintendent of Hacienda La Puente Unified School District in 1972. He served in the Marine Corps in World War II 1942–1946, discharged from active duty as a Battalion Quartmaster, First Lieutenant. He achieved the rank of Major in the USMC Reserve in 1952. He was named Citizen of the Year by the La Puente Valley Chamber of Commerce in 1965. He served Rotary as District 530 Governor from 1972 to 1973, and received the Paul Harris Fellow award in 1972.

In 2008, Wilson received media attention after a student promised a school shooting on the one year anniversary of the Virginia Tech shooting and around the anniversary of the Columbine High School shooting on the school's Wikipedia page. These threats were referred to the local police. On Thursday, April 17, 2008, security was increased and students' backpacks were searched. All after-school activities were cancelled. In addition, on Friday, April 18, 2008, school was cancelled as a precaution, although early that morning, a student was arrested in connection with the threats and held at Juvenile Hall.

School demographics
The school had 1594 students in 2015-2016

The ethnic composition of the student body was:
51.1% Hispanic or Latino
38.4% Asian
5.1% White
2.8% Filipino
1.2% African American

Athletics
The school's sport teams compete in the Valley Vista League to qualify for CIF Southern Section (CIF-SS). The Valle Vista League consists of  the Wilson Wildcats, Rowland Raiders, San Dimas Saints, Covina Colts, Nogales Nobles, and Northview Vikings

Notable alumni
Brian Tee - Actor, appeared in The Fast and the Furious: Tokyo Drift.
Lawrence Kao - Actor, appears in Wu Assassins.
Jill Sterkel - Olympic swimmer and Hall of Famer. She won four Olympic medals in Freestyle swimming events, and was the first woman to be on four Olympic swim teams.
Josh Keaton - Actor, voice actor, singer and music producer. Voice of Spider-Man in The Spectacular Spider-Man
David Lee (photographer) - Publisher of DestinationLuxury.com & fashion/celebrity photographer - www.davidclee.us
Scott Williams - Former NBA Basketball player, led the school to a state championship in his senior year.

Fergie (Stacy Ferguson) - singer of The Black Eyed Peas and Wild Orchid
Minae Noji - American actress, best known for the role of Karai on Teenage Mutant Ninja Turtles, Dr. Kelly Lee on General Hospital
Dr. Dong H. Kim - Director of the Mischer Neuroscience Institute at Memorial Hermann-Texas Medical Center, known for his role in the surgery and recovery of Representative Gabrielle Giffords.
Melissa King - Top Chef: Boston (Season 12), Finalist.  Top Chef: All-Stars LA (Season 17), Winner and Fan Favorite.

References

External links

Tour of Campus

High schools in Los Angeles County, California
International Baccalaureate schools in California
Public high schools in California
Hacienda Heights, California
Valle Vista League
1966 establishments in California